Lexitropsins are members of a family of semi-synthetic DNA-binding ligands.  They are structural analogs of the natural antibiotics netropsin and distamycin. Antibiotics of this group can bind in the minor groove of DNA with different sequence-selectivity. Lexitropsins form a complexes with DNA with stoichiometry 1:1 and 2:1. Based on the 2:1 complexes were obtained ligands with high sequence-selectivity.

See also 
 Hoechst 33258
 Pentamidine
 DNA binding ligand
 Single-strand binding protein
 Comparison of nucleic acid simulation software

References 

Molecular biology
DNA-binding substances